Royale Jakarta Golf Club is a golf course located in Jakarta, Indonesia.

Course
The 27-hole golf course at Royale Jakarta golf club consists of three, 9-hole courses:
North Course
South Course
West Course

Driving Range
Royale Jakarta has a practice range and gallery.

Tournaments
The 1st and 2nd Indonesian Masters 21–24 April 2011 and 19–22 April 2012, was won by Lee Westwood. The 3rd Indonesian Masters will be held on 2–5 May 2013.
The tournament was played on the South-West course with West course as holes 1 to 9 and South course as holes 10 to 18.

Scorecard

Course Ratings (unofficial)

References

External links
 Royale Jakarta Golf Club - official site

Golf clubs and courses in Indonesia
Sports venues in Jakarta